Jody Freeman (born 1964) is the Archibald Cox Professor at Harvard Law School and a leading expert on administrative law and environmental law. She served as Counselor for Energy and Climate Change in the Obama White House in 2009–2010.  She is a member of the American Academy of Arts and Sciences, a Fellow of the American College of Environmental Lawyers, and a member of the Council on Foreign Relations. Freeman served as Counselor for Energy and Climate Change in the Obama White House in 2009–2010.

Freeman is a leading scholar of both administrative law and environmental law, and has written extensively about climate change, environmental regulation and executive power. She is also known for her early work on "collaborative governance," which helped to establish a field focused on public-private approaches to regulatory problems. She has served as a member of the Administrative Conference of the United States, an expert body that advises the federal government on how to improve the regulatory and administrative process.

Freeman is widely published in leading American law reviews and was named the second-most cited scholar in public law across the nation.  She and Michael Gerrard published Climate Change and U.S. Law in 2015, and she has produced two other significant books: Moving to Markets in Environmental Regulation, Lessons after Twenty Years of Experience (2006, with economist Charles Kolstad) and Government by Contract: Outsourcing and American Democracy (2009, with Harvard Law School Dean Martha Minow). Freeman also co-authors a leading administrative law casebook. Her work has been published in several languages; a volume of her administrative law articles was published in Chinese in 2010.  

In 2006, Freeman authored an amicus brief on behalf of former United States Secretary of State Madeleine Albright in Massachusetts v. Environmental Protection Agency, the global warming case decided by the Supreme Court in 2007; in 2015, she and her colleague Richard Lazarus co-authored an amicus brief on behalf of William D. Ruckelshaus and William K. Reilly, former Administrators of the Environmental Protection Agency, supporting the government in the litigation over the Obama administration's Clean Power Plan.

Freeman grew up in Vancouver, British Columbia, and graduated from Stanford University (B.A., 1985), where she majored in human biology and played varsity volleyball, the University of Toronto (LL.B. 1989), and Harvard Law School (LL.M. 1991; SJD 1995). In 1990–91, she clerked at the Ontario Court of Appeal for a panel of judges including future Canadian Supreme Court Justice and UN High Commissioner Louise Arbour. From 1995 to 2005, Freeman was a Professor of Law at UCLA, where she co-founded the Environmental Law Program and was an award-winning teacher. From 2001 to 2004, Freeman also taught environmental law and served as Associate Dean for Law and Policy at the Bren School of Environmental Science & Management at UCSB.

In 2005, Freeman joined the Harvard Law School faculty. She was one of a number of prominent hires made during Dean Elena Kagan's tenure. In 2006, she founded Harvard's Environmental Law and Policy program, a legal "think tank" for climate and energy policy analysis, which also houses one of the nation's leading environmental law clinics. She has been a visiting professor at Georgetown Law Center, New York University Law School, and Stanford Law School.

In the White House, Freeman led the Obama administration's effort to double fuel efficiency standards, producing the historic agreement with the auto industry to set the nation's first federal greenhouse gas standards, and launching a program of greenhouse gas regulation under the Clean Air Act. As a Deputy and Counselor to Carol Browner, Director of the new White House Office of Energy and Climate Change, Freeman also contributed to a variety of policy initiatives on American energy and climate change issues, including greenhouse gas regulation, energy efficiency, renewable energy, oil and gas drilling, and the design of comprehensive legislation to place a market-based cap on carbon. After leaving the administration, she served as an independent consultant to the President's bipartisan Commission on the BP Deepwater Horizon Oil Spill, advising on structural reforms to offshore drilling.

Freeman is an outside director of ConocoPhillips, one of the largest independent energy companies in the world. She chairs the Board's public policy committee and serves on its executive committee. Freeman is also a member of the advisory council of the Electric Power Research Institute, which advises the electricity sector on technology gaps and broader social needs that can be addressed through pioneering research. She consults regularly for government and non-governmental parties, advising on litigation and regulatory strategy. Professor Freeman has lectured broadly around the world, including at the Nobel Institute, and in Asia and Europe. She can be heard regularly on NPR and on various podcasts on public affairs, has appeared on CNN and MSNBC, and has written for The New York Times, Wall Street Journal, Guardian, Los Angeles Times, Politico, Vox and Foreign Affairs.

References 

1964 births
American women lawyers
American lawyers
Canadian emigrants to the United States
Harvard Law School alumni
Harvard Law School faculty
Living people
People from Vancouver
Stanford University alumni
University of Toronto alumni
American women legal scholars
American legal scholars
American women academics
21st-century American women